The 1976 United States Grand Prix was a Formula One motor race held on October 10, 1976, at the Watkins Glen Grand Prix Race Course in Watkins Glen, New York. This event was also referred to as the United States Grand Prix East in order to distinguish it from the United States Grand Prix West held on March 28, 1976, in Long Beach, California.

Summary
Austrian Niki Lauda arrived in the United States for the penultimate race of 1976 with an eight-point lead over Britain's James Hunt in the driver's championship. Lauda had led comfortably with five wins in the season's first nine races, before his life-threatening crash at the Nürburgring in August. Hunt then won three of the next five races, including Germany where Lauda was injured. Lauda recovered to race in Italy and Canada (won by Hunt), but his lead over Hunt in the driver's championship had narrowed considerably.

Friday's first qualifying session saw only a handful of drivers venture out onto a wet race track. When Austrian Otto Stuppacher went out first, there were still streams of water running across in places. McLaren manager Teddy Mayer remarked, "The drivers finished in reverse ratio to the proportion of their IQs."

The rain stopped before the afternoon session began, and after 15 minutes on the still wet track, drivers began changing to slicks. Times dropped quickly on the drying track as driver after driver jumped to the top of the charts, only to fall back down again as the others went faster, too.

Hunt and Patrick Depailler, who was driving one of the six-wheeled Tyrrells, were dueling for top spot, with Depailler following Hunt's McLaren on the track, when the air bottle for the McLaren's compressor starter fell off and hit the Tyrrell's two left front wheels and the monocoque. Both wheels were broken, and even after stopping to replace them, Depailler's steering was out of line, and he could manage only seventh quickest. Later, as Hunt stood in the pits next to a four-foot, 150-pound air bottle, Rob Walker asked, "Was that the one you threw at Depailler?" Hunt answered, "No, we are keeping that one for Niki on Sunday!"

Hunt finished Friday on pole, ahead of Jody Scheckter's Tyrrell, the Marches of Ronnie Peterson and Vittorio Brambilla, and Lauda's Ferrari. Saturday's rain was worse than Friday morning's had been, so the times from Friday afternoon made up the grid. Stuppacher was the only one who failed to qualify.

Overnight, snow fell on the circuit, but the sun came out on Sunday as 100,000 fans, the largest paying crowd ever at The Glen, came out to see the championship battle. At the start, Scheckter jumped ahead of Hunt and led into the first turn. They were followed by Brambilla, Peterson, Lauda, Depailler, John Watson's Penske, the Lotus of Mario Andretti and Jacques Laffite's Ligier.

Scheckter and Hunt began to draw away immediately, with the Tyrrell 2.5 seconds ahead after five laps. After being held up by Brambilla for four laps, Lauda moved into third, 5.8 seconds behind Hunt. Meanwhile, a battle was being waged for fourth among Brambilla, Peterson, Laffite, Carlos Pace, Watson, Clay Regazzoni, Andretti and Jochen Mass. Hans-Joachim Stuck, who had qualified sixth but suffered a slipping clutch on the grid, was working his way forward and had now reached the end of this group.

Further down, on lap 15, the Ensign of Jacky Ickx went wide in Turn 6, a left-hander entering the 'Anvil' section of the course (known among spectators as 'The Boot'). The car suddenly snapped right and hit the Armco barrier head on. The nose went under the bottom rail, and the car split in two with the rear section spinning back onto the track in flames. Ickx stepped out of the wreckage of the cockpit and hobbled to the grass, where he collapsed with injuries to both his legs and ankles. Emerson Fittipaldi, who had been following him, said it was one of the worst accidents he had ever seen, and that he could hear the explosion of the car hitting the barrier above his engine and through his helmet and earplugs. Watson slowed briefly for the wreck, and was passed by Regazzoni and Mass before he got back up to full speed, putting him back to ninth place.

At the front, Scheckter's Tyrrell was losing grip as his fuel load lightened, and Hunt was getting quicker in the chasing McLaren. The gap closed to 1.3 seconds on lap 29, then half a second on lap 30. Finally, on lap 37, Hunt moved inside at the end of the back straight and took the lead. He pulled away by over two seconds in the next two laps, but on lap 41, he missed a gear in the chicane while trying to get around some backmarkers, and Scheckter retook the lead. Hunt passed him again at the end of the straight on lap 46 and held on to claim his sixth win of the season. Six laps from the finish, on lap 53, Hunt set the fastest lap of the race.

Lauda, struggling with oversteer on hard tires in the cold, barely beat Hunt's McLaren teammate Mass to the line to keep his third place. After the race, the Austrian removed his helmet to reveal a balaclava soaked in blood. He claimed four Championship points and still led by three points with one race to go. Lauda's third place clinched the Constructor's Championship for Ferrari with one race left.

Qualifying

Race

Championship standings after the race

Drivers' Championship standings

Constructors' Championship standings

References

Further reading
 Doug Nye (1978). The United States Grand Prix and Grand Prize Races, 1908-1977. B. T. Batsford. 
 Rob Walker (January, 1977). "18th United States Grand Prix: An Evening At The Glen". Road & Track, 81-84.

United States Grand Prix
United States Grand Prix
United States Grand Prix
United States Grand Prix
United States Grand Prix